Asura subcruciata is a moth of the family Erebidae.

References

subcruciata
Moths described in 1913
Taxa named by Walter Rothschild